The Seattle Mariners are a Major League Baseball franchise based in Seattle, Washington. Formed in 1977, they play in the American League West division. Pitchers for the Mariners have thrown six (6) no-hitters in franchise history. A no-hitter is officially recognized by Major League Baseball only when a pitcher (or pitchers) "allows no hits during the entire course of a game, which consists of at least nine innings." The first perfect game in Mariners' history (a special subcategory of no-hitter in which "no batter reaches any base during the course of the game")  was thrown on August 15, 2012 by Félix Hernández, who beat the Tampa Bay Rays in a 1–0 victory with 12 strikeouts. The Félix Hernández perfect game and Hisashi Iwakuma no hitter both took place as Wednesday matinee games that were "Mariners Camp Day" where the team hosted local summer camps. Of the six no-hitters, two were achieved in the Kingdome, three at Safeco Field—now known as T-Mobile Park—and one on the road, at Toronto's Rogers Centre.

List of no-hitters in Mariners history

See also
List of Major League Baseball no-hitters

References

External links
Seattle Mariners official website

No-hitters
Seattle Mariners